Potassium chloride, also known as potassium salt, is used as a medication to treat and prevent low blood potassium. Low blood potassium may occur due to vomiting, diarrhea, or certain medications. The concentrated version should be diluted before use. It is given by slow injection into a vein or by mouth.

Side effects may include heart problems if given too quickly by injection into a vein. By mouth it can result in abdominal pain, peptic ulcer disease, or gastrointestinal bleeding. Greater care is recommended in those with kidney problems. As long as high blood potassium does not occur, use in pregnancy or breastfeeding is believed to be safe for the baby. Generally, the strength of the formulation for injection into a vein should not be greater than 40 mmol/L (3 mg/L).

Potassium chloride came into large scale commercial use as a fertilizer in 1861 and has been used medically since the 1950s. It is on the World Health Organization's List of Essential Medicines. Potassium chloride is available as a generic medication. In 2020, it was the 33rd most commonly prescribed medication in the United States, with more than 17million prescriptions.

Medical use
Potassium chloride is used in the treatment of hypokalemia as an electrolyte replenisher. With a molecular weight of approximately 75 and a valence of 1, the use of KCl for electrolytes makes 75 mg the equivalent of 1 mEq.

Some cardiac surgery procedures cannot be carried out on the beating heart. For these procedures, the surgical team will bypass the heart with a heart-lung machine and inject potassium chloride into the heart muscle to stop the heartbeat.

Side effects
Side effects can include gastrointestinal discomfort, including nausea and vomiting, diarrhea, and bleeding of the digestive tract.

Overdoses cause hyperkalemia, which can lead to paresthesia, cardiac conduction blocks, fibrillation, arrhythmias, and sclerosis.

Because of the risk of small-bowel lesions, the US FDA requires some potassium salts containing more than 99 mg (about 1.3 mEq) to be labeled with a warning, while recommending an adult daily intake of 4700 mg (about 63 mEq).

History
Slow-K is a 1950s development where the medicine is formulated to enter the bloodstream at delayed intervals. It was first only prescribed to British military forces to balance their diets while serving in Korea.

Society

Brand names
Brand names include K-Dur, Klor-Con, Micro-K, Slow-K, Sando-K, and Kaon Cl.

Lethal injection
Potassium chloride is used in lethal injection as the third of a three-drug combination. KCl is also sometimes used in fetal intracardiac injections in second- and third-trimester induced abortions. Jack Kevorkian's thanatron machine injected a lethal dose of potassium chloride into the patient, which caused the heart to stop functioning, after a sodium thiopental-induced coma was achieved.

Cardiac arrest induced by potassium has been used in political assassinations in Iran, by injection or by inserting a potassium suppository into the victim's rectum.

References

External links
 

World Health Organization essential medicines
Wikipedia medicine articles ready to translate